Shalakusha is a rural locality (a settlement) in Nyandomsky District, Arkhangelsk Oblast, Russia. The population was 2,236 as of 2010. There are 42 streets.

Geography 
Shalakusha is located on the Moshe River, 136 km north of Nyandoma (the district's administrative centre) by road.

References 

Rural localities in Nyandomsky District